Boughrood and Llyswen railway station, in Boughrood Powys, Wales, was opened on 21 September 1864 by the Mid-Wales Railway as Boughrood Station, although excursions ran on 19 September and 20 September. It became Boughrood and Llyswen station on 1 October 1912 while under the ownership of the Cambrian Railways. On a single track main line, it had a passing loop with platforms on either side and a signal box at the northern end of the platform to Moat Lane Junction. The station closed on 31 December 1962.

References

Further reading

Disused railway stations in Powys
Railway stations in Great Britain opened in 1864
Railway stations in Great Britain closed in 1962
Former Cambrian Railway stations
1962 disestablishments in Wales